Edenvale is a small city on the East Rand in Gauteng, South Africa. The greater Edenvale area has an estimated population of 70,000, including Greenstone, Harmelia, Highway Gardens, Buurendal and Croydon. Edenvale is part of the Ekurhuleni Metropolitan Municipality. It lies about halfway between the O.R. Tambo International Airport and the Johannesburg city centre and is located 12 km by road from Sandton and about 9 km from the closest Gautrain station.

History
It started out in 1903, after the Anglo Boer War as a small settlement named Rietfontein which sprung up around the Rietfontein Gold Mine. It was made a municipality in 1942. It was initially populated by Cornish mineworkers.

Suburbs of Edenvale 
Residential suburbs include:

Clarens Park

De Klerkshof

Dowerglen

Dunvegan

Eastleigh (part residential)

Edenglen

Elma Park

Hurlyvale

Illiondale

Isandovale (part residential)

Marais Steyn Park

Rietfontein (part of Rietfontein 61-ir) (Rietfontein 63-ir)

Industrial suburbs include:

Sebenza

Eastleigh (part industrial)

Isandovale (part industrial)

Demographics
Edenvale is a busy city that ranges from middle-class areas such as Edenvale Central, Eastleigh and Illiondale, to the more upper-class areas such as Dowerglen and Edenglen. Edenvale Central (locally referred to as The Avenues) has seen high investment over the past few years in the form of upper-income clusters and townhouses. This has resulted in small-scale gentrification and hence an increase in coffee shops and streetside cafes. There is also a trend in Eastleigh and Illiondale to purchase derelict properties and renovate them, which has also benefitted the area. Much of Edenvale widely diversified by immigration to other parts of Africa, notably: Zambians and Malawians. It also hosts a large population of Portuguese, Greeks and Italians.

Economy

Retail
In the last ten years, the area to the north of Edenvale (Modderfontein) has expanded significantly. Five malls have been erected, Greenstone and Stoneridge mall, Eden Meadows, Stonehill Crossing and Green Valley as well as an array of complexes and townhouses, in an area now called Greenstone Hill and Greenstone Park, just west of Illiondale. This recent, yet rapid influx of infrastructure and added commercial business has bankrupted businesses in Lungile Mtshali Road (formerly Van Riebeeck Road; the main thoroughfare through the Edenvale City Centre) forcing numerous store owners to liquidate their capital investments.

Law and government

Government
In 1995, after the local government elections, Edenvale was amalgamated with some surrounding areas, including Modderfontein, Rabie Ridge Extensions 4 and 5, Chloorkop and the western part of Tembisa to form the Lethabong municipality, as part of the short-lived transitional Khayalami Metropolitan Council, which also included Midrand and Kempton Park/Tembisa. This arrangement ended in 2000, and Edenvale is now part of the Ekurhuleni Metropolitan Municipality, which includes much of the East Rand, while Modderfontein and Rabie Ridge became part of the City of Johannesburg Metropolitan Municipality.

References

Further reading
A history of Edenvale

External links
 Edenvale
 Greenstone
 Stoneridge mall
 Edenvale
 Edenvale history

Germiston
Populated places in Ekurhuleni